Francis Ambrose Moss (1862 – 30 July 1940) was a mine manager in Perth, Western Australia.

History
Moss was born at Mount Barker, South Australia to Simeon Moss (c. 1821 – 15 September 1903) and his wife Annie Moss, née Thompson (c. 1825 – 15 February 1886).

He was educated at Whinham College in North Adelaide, and the Ballarat School of Mines, graduating in 1889. He began working for BHP at Broken Hill, becoming chief assayer, then worked as assistant metallurgist at their Port Pirie smelter.

He returned to Broken Hill, where he spent a year working underground, then another year at the Victorian goldfields. He sailed to Albany, Western Australia in October 1893 with his brother Ned, and according to one report travelled on foot to Coolgardie (some 700km), where they worked the Coonega and Lady Margaret goldfields near Comet Vale, though the credit for their discovery may belong to their associate Dan Baker. He purchased the Sand Queen claim, from two of its finders, Tom Caldwell and Dick Delaney. After some disappointments this claim later proved to be highly valuable.

In 1895 he moved to Menzies, some 35km away, to serve as manager of the Central Exploration Company.

By 1897 he was BHP's representative in Western Australia, with temporary offices in Hannan Street, Kalgoorlie, offering to purchase gold-bearing ore of any description.

That same year he was working as assayer for the Kalgurli mine on the Golden Mile, then in April 1900 was appointed general manager of that and the Hainault mine.
In 1907 he resigned both positions (replaced by Archie Hay and Robert S. Black) to set up a tin dredging plant at Greenbushes, Western Australia, which he ran for 17 years. During this period he also managed the Sand Queen mine. In 1915 he purchased the Lancefield mine at Beria with Richard "Dick" Hamilton and George Ridgway.

He died at his home at 31 Angelo Street, South Perth and his remains were interred in the Church of England section of Karrakatta Cemetery.
Mrs Moss died 22 December 1944 at the same residence, and was buried with Roman Catholic rites at that section of the Fremantle cemetery.

Memberships and other interests
Australasian Institute of Mining Engineers, president 1907
Moss was a foundation member of the West Australian Chamber of Mines
He was a trustee of Perth public library, museum and art gallery
He was a trustee of the Perth and Kalgoorlie (Anglican) dioceses

Family
Moss married Marian or Marion (died 22 December 1944); they had one son:
Dr. Frank Ambrose Seddon Moss, B.Sc., M.A., Ph.D. (23 May 1899 – 1980) married Dora Killikelly ( – )
He was involved in examination of gold prospects in California and Nevada, then geologist in charge of geophysical prospecting with the Gulf Oil Corporation in California 1927–1031.
He returned to Australia, where he used his experience in aerial photography to search for oil in the Longreach district.
He was a director of Meekatharra Sands Treatment & Mining N.L., founded 1947, had an office at 95 St Georges Terrace, Perth.

Among F. A. Moss's brothers and sisters were:
Edward "Ned" Moss (1859– )
Herbert William Moss (1869– ) 
Edward and Herbert operated a gold ore reduction plant, Kalgoorlie,
Emily Annie Moss married Donald Archibald McLachlan on 27 April 1870
Albertina Moss married Adam Watson Richardson J.P. (died 1894), pharmacist of Mount Barker, South Australia, on 28 March 1883.

References 

1862 births
1940 deaths
Australian mining engineers
Australian mine managers
Burials at Karrakatta Cemetery